Rudaw Media Network (or ), is a media group known for its news channel in Kurdistan Region, Iraq. It publishes in  Kurdish Sorani and Kurmanji, English, Arabic and Turkish. Rudaw Media Network also owns a weekly newspaper in the Sorani dialect with a circulation of 3,000, a Kurmanji version published in Europe, a website in Kurdish, English, Arabic and Turkish and a satellite TV station. The network is funded and supported by Rudaw Company and aims to impart news and information about Kurdistan and the Middle East.

Rudaw Media Network was temporarily banned in Syrian Kurdistan due to its partisan news and alleged smear campaigns against the Kurdish political parties which oppose the Kurdistan Democratic Party, a ruling political party led by the Barzani family members. 

Turkey removed three television channels based in The Kurdistan Region, including Kurdish news agency Rudaw, from its TurkSat satellite over broadcasting violations during the Kurdistan Region's Independence Referendum On September 25th, 2017.

On 28 October 2017, the office of audio visual media of the Iraqi government's Media and Communications Commission issued a decree, ordering the shutdown of Rudaw TV broadcast, prevention of its crews and seizure of their equipment across Iraq. The decree says that the grounds for this move are that Rudaw is not licensed in Baghdad, and for programs "that incite violence and hate and target social peace and security".

Platform 
Rudaw is based in Erbil, the capital city of the Kurdistan Region of Iraq. The company has correspondents in various parts of the Middle East, Europe and the U.S. Rudaw publishes in the Kurdish dialects Sorani and Kurmanji as well as in English.

Digital portal
An online platform that covers Kurdish issues in both Kurdish dialects. The website also publishes news and information in English, Turkish and Arabic.

Radio
A radio news channel that broadcasts on shortwave across the Middle East. Audiences all over the world can listen to a live stream online.

Newspaper
Published on a weekly basis, with hard copies sold in the Kurdistan Region and Europe. In the Kurdistan edition, stories of interest to the local population are covered. The European edition features issues of interest to the Kurdish diaspora.

Television
A Kurdish news channel that broadcasts to the Middle East, Europe, Africa, Asia, Pacific, Canada and the U.S. This newly launched channel can be received on NileSat and Hot Bird satellites.

Awards

The World Association of Newspapers and News Publishers recognized Rudaw for extending its reach to 100 million in social media in 2017.

Majeed Gly, a Kurdish correspondent for Rudaw Media Network, was awarded the Ricardo Ortega Memorial Prize for broadcast media by the United Nations Correspondents Association (UNCA) at its headquarters in New York.

Criticism
A number of international and Kurdish sources have described Rudaw as a "propaganda machine" of the ruling Kurdistan Democratic Party, particularly The current President Of The Kurdistan Region Nechirvan Barzani.

Sources

External links

 

Television stations in Kurdistan Region (Iraq)
Television stations in Iraq
Kurdish-language mass media
Mass media in Kurdistan Region (Iraq)
2008 establishments in Iraqi Kurdistan
Mass media companies of Iraq